Janne Läspä (born 2 April 2002) is a Finnish athlete who specializes in the javelin throw. He was the gold medallist at the World Athletics U20 Championships in 2021.

References

External links 

 Janne Läspä at World Athletics

 

2002 births
Living people
Finnish male javelin throwers
World Athletics U20 Championships winners
21st-century Finnish people